The August 24th Movement (M24A) – officially called Territorial Equity Movement (MET) – is a regionalist political party in Italy, launched in August 2019. Its leader is the journalist Pino Aprile.

History 
During the 2019 government crisis in Italy, Pino Aprile called for a meeting on 24 August in the Grancia Park, Basilicata, near Brindisi Montagna, to counter Matteo Salvini's victory in the snap election he requested. More than 500 people from the southern regions of Italy attended the meeting and the foundation of the party, including senator Saverio De Bonis, criticizing the differentiated autonomy pursued by Lombardy, Veneto and Emilia-Romagna.
On 13 October, Aprile officially presented the charter of the party and its logo in the "Aroldo Tieri" movie theatre in Cosenza. Since 2021, MEP Piernicola Pedicini joined the August 24th Movement, assuming the position of vice-president.

Leadership
President: Pino Aprile (2019–present)
Vice-President: Piernicola Pedicini (2021–2022)
Secretary: Piernicola Pedicini (2022–present)

References

External links
 Official website

2019 establishments in Italy
Regionalist parties in Italy
Political parties established in 2019